Kang Jun-kyu (born August 9, 1993), better known by his stage name Jun.Q, is a South Korean rapper, singer, actor, and model. Signed to H2 Media, he made his debut with idol quintet Myname in 2011. His acting debut took place two years later in the film Shinokubo Story along with his bandmates. He appeared on the web series beautiology101 in his home country and starred in the film Saihate Restaurant in Japan. He released his debut solo single "Firenze" in November 2019.

Life and career

1993–2010: Early life and career beginnings
Jun.Q was born Kang Jun-kyu on August 9, 1993, in Uijeongbu, the younger of two children and first son to his parents. As a middle school student, he played the guitar in his school band. He was encouraged by his homeroom teacher to pursue a career as a singer and Jun.Q persuaded his parents to enroll him into a performance hagwon. He moved to the Guro District upon entering high school and lived alone. During his first year as a high school student, he was a model for school science and social studies textbooks. Due to the strain of being a student and trainee, Jun.Q briefly cut off communication with his agency. After hearing trainee stories of his friends, he decided to apologize to the CEO and returned to the company. He graduated from the School of Performing Arts Seoul in 2012.

2011–present: Music and acting career

Jun.Q debuted as a rapper in the idol group Myname in 2011. The group released its debut single "Message" on October 28. After learning of his debut as a singer, the publisher of the school textbooks sought to renew their contract with Jun.Q; they received a conditional agreement from H2 Media to publish photography taken by the company. A Japanese-language version of Myname's debut song was released the following July, which served as their introductory single in the country. The group was simultaneously active in the music industry of both countries. Having expressed interest in acting in 2012, he starred in the film Shinokubo Story (2013) along with Myname, where he played one of five characters seeking to become "stars".

Beginning in 2015, Myname's promotional activities in South Korea waned. Jun.Q went on to compete on the survival competition series The Unit: Idol Rebooting Project along with bandmates Seyong, Chaejin, and Gunwoo. It was their first domestic promotional activities in two years. The participants competed to become a member of the all-male unit UNB. Jun.Q was eliminated and was listed at number 24 on the program's rankings. He was cast on OnStyle's web drama beautiology101 (2016) as Du Yi. The series centers around cosmetics and takes place at the fictional K-Beauty School. He also played the role of Eiji in the 2016 Japanese drama Kyabasuka Gakuen. He starred in the film Saihate Restaurant (2019) alongside Ryouta Murai. He released his debut solo single "Firenze" on November 8, 2019.

Jun.Q enlisted in mandatory military service on June 22, 2020. He received military training at the Korea Army Training Center in Nonsan, South Chungcheong Province.

Musical style
Jun.Q has cited Dynamic Duo and Jay-Z as his role models.

Discography

Singles

Filmography

Television series

Films

References

1993 births
21st-century South Korean male actors
21st-century South Korean male  singers
Japanese-language singers of South Korea
K-pop singers
Living people
People from Uijeongbu
Myname members
School of Performing Arts Seoul alumni
South Korean contemporary R&B singers
South Korean dance musicians
South Korean J-pop singers
South Korean male film actors
South Korean male idols
South Korean male models
South Korean male television actors
South Korean pop singers